Oxford House is a First Nations Cree community in northern Manitoba, located on the Oxford House 24 Indian reserve. The Hayes River was designated a Canadian Heritage River in 2006.

The Bunibonibee Cree Nation have reserved for themselves 13 separate tracts, of which Oxford House 24 serves as their main reserve, containing the settlement of Oxford House.

History
 
People from nearby areas moved to the trading site and formed the community of Oxford House. The United Church played a major role in the development of the community. The ministers and their wives were the first nurses and teachers.

People of Oxford House

When the Dust Settles
 
In 2016, N'we Jinan travelled to Oxford House and made two music videos with indigenous youth living there, "When the Dust Settles" and "BoiDee". The two videos received attention from outside the community for the insight they offer into the problems facing youth living on remote reserves. The songs are included on the N'We Jinan album, Silent War recorded in Vancouver in 2017.

Demographics
Oxford House 24 Indian reservation had a population of 1,864 in 2011 living in 335 dwellings on a land area of 51.01 square km. The median age was 21.4. Cree was selected as the mother tongue of 1,500 residents.

Infrastructure
Oxford House has a high school, elementary school, a pre-school (Head Start) an arena, a Northern Store with a Tim Hortons, a nursing station, a Royal Canadian Mounted Police detachment, the University College of the North Centre, an airport, a motel (Triple B), water treatment plant, band office, care home, medivac operation/emergency, youth building, a radio station, and a conservation office.

Fire Hall 
The Oxford House Fire Hall was built in 2015.

Care Home 
George Colon Memorial Home was built in 1988.

Outdoor Rink 
The Outdoor Rinks were built in 2015. They are located on each end of the community. The outdoor rink is for everyone.

Churches 
There are 5 Churches in Oxford House. They are United Church, R.C Church, Niyahk Bible Chapel, Full Gospel, Pentecostal Church.

Northern Store 
The new addition of the Northern store officially opened in October 29, 2012.  The Northern Store has its own grocery and retail section, along with its own Tim Horton express, and a post office.

Super B's 
The newest business in Oxford House opened in January 2017, owned and managed by local staff. Super B's is a convenience store with a kitchen that provides a partial menu.

University College of the North Centre 
The Oxford House UCN Centre opened its doors at 2015.

Elementary school 
Elementary School was built in 1974 and completed in 1975.

References

External links
 Map of Oxford House 24 at Statcan
 When the Dust Settles on Youtube
 Boidee on Youtube

Indian reserves in Northern Region, Manitoba
Hudson's Bay Company trading posts
Unincorporated communities in Northern Region, Manitoba